|}
{| class="collapsible collapsed" cellpadding="0" cellspacing="0" style="clear:right; float:right; text-align:center; font-weight:bold;" width="280px"
! colspan="3" style="border:1px solid black; background-color: #77DD77;" | Also Ran

The 1979 Epsom Derby was the 200th annual running of the Derby horse race. It took place at Epsom Downs Racecourse on 6 June 1979. With a prize of £153,980 to the winner, the race value was a significant increase on the £98,410 offered the previous year and a record for a race contested in Europe

The winter ante-post market was headed by Tromos who was followed by More Light, Gregorian, Sandy Creek and Troy. However, only the latter named would line up at Epsom. Dewhurst Stakes winner Tromos picked up a virus after finishing runner up in the Craven Stakes, More Light was decisively beaten in both the Heath Stakes and the Dante Stakes, Gregorian was unraced again after beaten 8¾ lengths in the Ballymoss Stakes while Sandy Creek never returned to the racecourse after his juvenile season. On the day of the race, the market was headed by Guy Harwood's Ela-Mana-Mou who had supplemented his juvenile success in the Royal Lodge Stakes by winning the Heath Stakes by four lengths. Next in the market was Troy who had won four of his previous five starts including the Vintage Stakes, Sandown Classic Trial and Predominate Stakes. One of three representatives for Dick Hern, who had been attempting to win the race for twenty years, he was the chosen mount of Willie Carson. Milford and Tap On Wood were the remaining horses in the single digit price range with the former winning his trials at Ascot and Sandown by a combined fifteen lengths, and the latter a surprise 20/1 winner of the 2000 Guineas.

The pace was set by Henry Cecil's Lyphard's Wish and his lead lasted until a furlong and a half from home when passed by the Irish trained Dickens Hill.Dickens Hill's lead would not last long however as Troy, who had struggled for pace early on and was only in thirteenth place at Tattenham Corner, stormed past for an emphatic victory. The winning margin of seven lengths was the widest recorded since Manna in 1925. The race was in danger of being marred as a toilet roll was thrown at the runners by a spectator at Tattenham Corner. Yves Saint-Martin, riding Vincent O'Brien's Accomplice, passed the finishing with the paper still attached to his head although he stated that the incident did not cost him the race.

Race details
 Sponsor: none
 Winner's prize money: £153,980
 Going: Good
 Number of runners: 23
 Winner's time: 2 minutes, 36.59 seconds

Full result

Winner details
Further details of the winner, Troy:

 Foaled: 25 March 1976, in Ireland
 Sire: Petingo; Dam: La Milo (Hornbeam)
 Owner: Sir Michael Sobell & Lord Weinstock
 Breeder: Ballymacoll Stud

Form analysis

Two-year-old races
Notable runs by the future Derby participants as two-year-olds in 1978:
<div style="font-size:85%">
 Accomplice - 1st Ashford Castle Stakes, Beresford Stakes
 Dickens Hill - 1st Anglesey Stakes, 2nd National Stakes Ela-Mana-Mou - 2nd Vintage Stakes, 1st Royal Lodge Stakes Hardgreen - 3rd Mill Reef Stakes, 2nd Horris Hill Stakes Lake City - 1st Coventry Stakes Laska Floko - 4th Futurity Stakes 
 Lyphard's Wish - 1st Solario Stakes, 3rd Royal Lodge Stakes, 3rd Futurity Stakes 
 Man Of Vision - 2nd Acomb Stakes Milford - 2nd Houghton Stakes, 2nd Clarence House Stakes Saracen Prince - 3rd Vintage Stakes Son Of Love - 1st Prix Isonomy Tap On Wood - 1st National Stakes Troy - 1st Vintage Stakes, 2nd Royal Lodge Stakes</div>

The road to Epsom
Early-season appearances in 1979 and trial races prior to running in the Derby:
 Cracaval - 1st - Chester Vase
 Dickens Hill - 2nd Vauxhall Trial Stakes, 1st Ballymoss -Stakes, 1st Irish 2000 Guineas 
 Ela-Mana-Mou - 1st Heath Stakes
 Halyudh - 2nd Lingfield Derby Trial
 Hardgreen - 2nd Dante Stakes
 Lake City - 1st 2,000 Guineas Trial Stakes, 3rd Dante Stakes
 Laska Floko - 5th Dante Stakes
 Lyphard's Wish - 1st Craven Stakes, 5th 2000 Guineas, 1st Dante Stakes
 Man Of Vision - 1st Easter Stakes, 4th Prix Lupin
 Milford - 1st White Rose Stakes, 1st Lingfield Derby Trial
 Niniski - 2nd Glasgow Stakes 
 Noelino - 1st Nijinsky Stakes
 Northern Baby - 2nd Prix de Suresnes, 2nd Prix La Force
 Son Of Love - 2nd Prix Noailles
 Tap On Wood - 1st 2000 Guineas Stakes
 Two Of Diamonds - 2nd Sandown Classic Trial, 1st Dee Stakes
 Troy – 1st Sandown Classic Trial, 1st Predominate Stakes

Subsequent Group 1 wins
Group 1 / Grade I victories after running in the Derby.
 Dickens Hill - Eclipse Stakes (1979) 
 Ela-Mana-Mou - Eclipse Stakes (1980), King George VI and Queen Elizabeth Stakes (1980)
 Lyphard's Wish - United Nations Handicap (1980)
 Niniski - Irish St. Leger (1979), Prix Royal-Oak (1979)
 Northern Baby - Champion Stakes (1979)
 Son Of Love - St Leger Stakes (1979)
 Troy – Irish Derby (1979), King George VI and Queen Elizabeth Stakes (1979),Benson and Hedges Gold Cup (1979) 

Subsequent breeding careers
Leading progeny of participants in the 1979 Epsom Derby.

Sires of Classic winners
Niniski (9th)
 Minster Son - 1st St Leger Stakes (1988)
 Assessor - 1st Prix Royal-Oak (1992)
 Hernando - 1st Prix du Jockey Club (1993)
 Alflora - 1st Queen Anne Stakes (1993)

Troy (1st) 
 Helen Street - 1st Irish Oaks (1985) Dam of Street Cry
 Walensee - 1st Prix Vermeille (1985) Dam of Westerner	
 Cocotte - 2nd Prix de Psyché (1986) Dam of Pilsudski and Fine Motion
 Sheer Audacity - Dam of Oath (1st Epsom Derby 1999)
Northern Baby (3rd)
 Michelozzo - 1st St Leger Stakes (1989)
 Possibly Perfect - American Champion Female Turf Horse (1995)
 Baby Turk - 1st Grand Prix de Deauville (1986) - Sire of Azertyuiop
 Warm Spell - American Champion Steeplechase Horse (1989)
Ela-Mana-Mou (4th)
 Eurobird - 1st Irish St. Leger (1987)
 Snurge - 1st St Leger Stakes (1990)
 Double Trigger - 1st Ascot Gold Cup (1995)
 Fair of the Furze - 1st Rogers Gold Cup (1986) - Dam of White Muzzle

Sires of Group/Grade One winners
Lyphard's Wish (5th)
 Derby Wish - 1st Secretariat Stakes (1985)
 Art Francais - 3rd Poule d'Essai des Poulains (1986)
 Vertige - 2nd Prix Jacques le Marois (1985)
 Villez - 1st Prix Cambacérès (1995) 

Sires of National Hunt horses
Dickens Hill (2nd) 
 Victorian Hill - 1st Iroquois Steeplechase (1991, 1992)

Other Stallions
Tap On Wood (12th) - Royal Touch (2nd Prix de la Forêt 1989), Miss Boniface (3rd Prix de la Salamandre 1987)Milford (10th) - Cunizza da Romano (2nd Oaks d'Italia 1987), Luck Mugen (3rd Oka Sho 1992) - Exported to JapanHalyudh (21st) - Mr Boston (2nd Midlands Grand National 1992)Hardgreen (6th) - Minor flat and jumps winnersMan Of Vision (7th) - Exported to JapanLake City (17th) - Exported to VenezuelaLaska Floko (22nd) - Exported to South Africa

References

External links
 Colour Chart – Derby 1979  - 1979 Derby Stakes''

Epsom Derby
Epsom Derby
Epsom Derby
Epsom Derby
 1979
20th century in Surrey